Jagatnagar Kalibari  (Bengali: জগৎনগর কালীবাড়ি) is a Hindu temple located in Jagatnagar near Singur in Hooghly district, dedicated to goddess Kali. It is situated 34 km away from Kolkata.

See also 
 Belur Math
 Dakshineswar Kali Temple

External links

References 

Hindu temples in West Bengal